Mount Gould is a prominent mountain, 2,385 m, surmounting the central part of the Tapley Mountains, in the Queen Maud Mountains in Antarctica.  It was discovered in December 1929 by the Byrd Antarctic Expedition geological party under Laurence Gould.  Named by Byrd for president Laurence M. Gould of Carleton College, polar explorer who served as geologist and second in command of the Byrd Antarctic Expedition, 1928–30.  From 1955–1970, Gould was a leader in the planning of the U.S. Antarctic Research Program, and has served as chairman of the National Academy of Sciences Committee on Polar Research, and chairman of the international Scientific Committee on Antarctic Research.

References 

Gould, Mount